was a  after Yōwa and before Genryaku. This period spanned the years from May 1182 through March 1184.

Change of era
 1182 : The new era name was created to mark an event or a number of events. The previous era ended and a new one commenced in Yōwa 2, on the 27th day of the 5th month of 1182.

Events of the Juei era
 1182 (Juei 1): The entire country suffers a famine.
 1183 (Juei 2, 25th day of 7th month): The Heike flee the capital with Emperor Antoku and Three Sacred Treasures.
 1183 (Juei 2, 20th day of the 8th month): In the 3rd year of Antoku-tennōs reign (安徳天皇25年), the emperor fled the capital rather than give in to pressures for his abdication. In Antoku's absence, the cloistered former-Emperor Go-Shirakawa then elevated his young brother by decree; and the young child was given the acceptance of abdication (juzen) rites. The anti-Taira faction intended that the succession (senso) was received; and shortly thereafter, Emperor Go-Toba is said to have acceded to the throne (sokui).
 1183 (Juei 2, 20th day of 8th month): Emperor Go-Toba is enthroned without the imperial regalia.
 1183 (Juei 2, 20th day of the 8th month): Go-Toba is proclaimed emperor by the Genji; and consequently, there were two proclaimed emperors, one living in Heian-kyō and another in flight towards the south.
 1184 (Juei 3', 2nd month): Cloistered Emperor Go-Shirakawa orders letter to be written to the Heike demanding the restoration or return of the imperial regalia.

Notes

References
 Brown, Delmer M. and Ichirō Ishida, eds. (1979).  Gukanshō: The Future and the Past. Berkeley: University of California Press. ;  OCLC 251325323
 Nussbaum, Louis-Frédéric and Käthe Roth. (2005).  Japan encyclopedia. Cambridge: Harvard University Press. ;  OCLC 58053128
 Titsingh, Isaac. (1834). Nihon Odai Ichiran; ou,  Annales des empereurs du Japon.  Paris: Royal Asiatic Society, Oriental Translation Fund of Great Britain and Ireland. OCLC 5850691
 Varley, H. Paul. (1980). A Chronicle of Gods and Sovereigns: Jinnō Shōtōki of Kitabatake Chikafusa. New York: Columbia University Press. ;  OCLC 6042764

External links
 National Diet Library, "The Japanese Calendar" -- historical overview plus illustrative images from library's collection

Japanese eras
1180s in Japan